is a Japanese mixed martial artist currently competing in the Welterweight division. A professional competitor since 1996, he has competed for the UFC, PRIDE Fighting Championships, Pancrase, DREAM, World Victory Road, DEEP, Shooto, and Vale Tudo Japan. He is the former Pancrase Light Heavyweight Champion (2001–2003) and the winner of the ADCC 88 kg class in 2001.

Early life
Kikuta started training in Judo in his childhood, winning the Kantō Middleweight class when he was in 3rd grade. He became a student at the Super Tiger Gym when he was in the 6th grade, learning Shooto under Satoru Sayama, but he left on the feeling that he wasn't being given enough attention in the combative aspect. Kikuta later joined the Judo team again at high school, where he won the 86 kg class at the National Athletic Highschool Meeting. He also learned under Toshihiko Koga at the Nippon Sport Science University.

During his university tenure, Kikuta also tried Professional Wrestling, failing to enter New Japan Pro-Wrestling, but being accepted in Union of Wrestling Forces International and training with them for a time before leaving. After considering finding a job as a Judo teacher, Kikuta applied again to the entrance exam for NJPW, but he failed for a second time, this time due to showing dehydration symptoms during a sparring with fellow examinee Kenichi Yamamoto. Kikuta left college and went to train Kickboxing under Stan Longinidis in Australia. Upon his return to Japan, Kikuta started training at Seidokaikan and won the All Japan amateur Shootboxing heavyweight championship. However, after watching Royce Gracie win the first Ultimate Fighting Championship events, he became interested in Mixed Martial Arts.

Mixed martial arts career
Kikuta had his MMA debut for the first tournament hosted in 1996 by Lumax Cup, which featured the use of keikogi. Kikuta won after beating Egan Inoue and Masanori Suda. He then went to compete in the Vale Tudo Japan event, but was defeated by Mushtaq Abdullah by forearm choke. After returning to Lumax Cup, he won the 1997 tournament, too, defeating Suda again.

PRIDE Fighting Championships
Kikuta made his worldwide MMA debut for the PRIDE promotion at its second event, where he faced Brazilian jiu-jitsu expert Renzo Gracie in a special rules match. The fight turned out to be a slow, methodical bout which lasted six fifteen minutes rounds, whose end saw Renzo submitting Kikuta via guillotine choke at the sixth one.

Kikuta returned to PRIDE to face Takada Dojo understudy Daijiro Matsui. Again, the fight was a technical battle, ending with a draw after none of the fighters could finish the other.

At PRIDE 20, Kikuta fought Alexander Otsuka. This time the fight was a controversial one, with Otsuka throwing several knees to the groin which weren't penalized. Despite so, Sanae controlled the match with dominant positions and soccer kicks, and won by unanimous decision.

At UFO Legend, Kikuta fought PRIDE competitor Antonio Rodrigo Nogueira. The two grappling specialists exchanged assaults on the ground, with the Brazilian taking down Kikuta and attacking his half guard before the Japanese capitalized on a failed calf slicer to switch positions. Kikuta pressed from the top, but Nogueira regained full guard and scrambled to switch positions again, where the Japanese defended again from half guard. At the second round, Kikuta looked to take the match to the ground again, but it took a sudden twist when Nogueira landed a surprising right hook, knocking Sanae out completely. Nogueira was declared the winner.

Sanae fought again for PRIDE in the event Shockwave 2005, taking on Makoto Takimoto, judo gold medalist and apprentice to Hidehiko Yoshida. Kikuta opened the fight pulling guard, after which the two judoka traded positions and submission attempts with Sanae coming over in most of them. Having maintained the advantage for all of the three rounds both standing and on the ground, Kikuta was given the unanimous decision win.

Pancrase
After a single match for Shooto, Kikuta joined the Pancrase fighting organization in April 1994. He scored big victories over veterans Minoru Suzuki and Ryushi Yanagisawa, and shortly after he founded the Grabaka team along with Genki Sudo, Eiji Ishikawa and Hiroo Matsunaga. Kikuta also participated in the ADCC Submission Wrestling World Championship in April 2001 and won its 88 kg class. In September 2001 he won the title of Pancrase Light Heavyweight Champion.

He currently runs the Grabaka gym in Nakano, Tokyo, which trains fighters such as Kazunori Yokota, Akihiro Gono, and formerly Genki Sudo, and Kazuo Misaki.

Ultimate Fighting Championship
In his sole apparition for Ultimate Fighting Championship, Kikuta took part in the event Ultimate Japan III in April 2000. He defeated Eugene Jackson in dominant fashion, taking him down and locking an armbar for the submission.

World Victory Road
On January 4, 2009 at World Victory Road Presents: Sengoku Rebellion 2009, Kikuta faced fellow judoka Hidehiko Yoshida. The bout started characteristically slow, with Kikuta taking Yoshida down and tentatively exchanging strikes with him. At the second round, Kikuta opted for pulling guard and pursuing an ankle lock, but Yoshida remained on top and landed several punches through his guard. Afterwards, however, Kikuta reversed and got the mount, unloading ground and pound until the end of the round. The third round saw Yoshida stunning Kikuta with a punch and scoring a judo throw, but Sanae took his back and kept striking on him for the rest of the match, eventually winning the decision.

Championships and accomplishments

Grappling
Abu Dhabi Combat Club
ADCC 2001 88 kg class winner (April 2001)

Judo
Kantō region Judo Middleweight winner
The National Athletic High School Meeting, Judo 86 kg class Winner

Mixed martial arts
Lumax Cup
Tournament of J'96 Winner
Tournament of J'97 Winner
Pancrase
Pancrase Light heavyweight Champion (One time)
Tokyo Sports
Technique Award (2001)

Shootboxing
Japan Shootboxing Association
All Japan Amateur Shoot boxing Championship Heavyweight Winner

Mixed martial arts record

|-
| Loss
| align=center| 31–9–3 (1)
| Song Kenan 
| Decision (unanimous)
| Real Fighting Championship: Real 1
| 
| align=center| 3
| align=center| 5:00
| Tokyo, Japan
|Return to Welterweight.
|-
| Win
| align=center| 31–8–3 (1)
| Masayuki Naruse
| Submission (armbar)
| Grabaka Live 3
| 
| align=center| 1
| align=center| 2:25
| Tokyo, Japan
|Openweight bout.
|-
| Loss
| align=center| 30–8–3 (1)
| Yuji Sakuragi
| KO (knee and soccer kick)
| Grabaka Live 2
| 
| align=center| 1
| align=center| 0:35
| Tokyo, Japan
|Light Heavyweight bout.
|-
| Win
| align=center| 30–7–3 (1)
| Kenichi Yamamoto
| TKO (punches)
| Grabaka Live: 1st Cage Attack
| 
| align=center| 1
| align=center| 2:18
| Tokyo, Japan
|
|-
| Win
| align=center| 29–7–3 (1)
| Lee Sak Kim
| TKO (corner stoppage)
| DEEP: 50 Impact
| 
| align=center| 1
| align=center| 1:21
| Tokyo, Japan
|Catchweight (79 kg) bout.
|-
| Loss
| align=center| 28–7–3 (1)
| Yasubey Enomoto
| TKO (punches)
| World Victory Road Presents: Sengoku Raiden Championships 13
| 
| align=center| 1
| align=center| 3:57
| Tokyo, Japan
|
|-
| Win
| align=center| 28–6–3 (1)
| Hidehiko Yoshida
| Decision (split)
| World Victory Road Presents: Sengoku no Ran 2009
| 
| align=center| 3
| align=center| 5:00
| Saitama, Japan
|Return to Light Heavyweight.
|-
| Win
| align=center| 27–6–3 (1)
| Chris Rice
| Submission (armbar)
| World Victory Road Presents: Sengoku 3
| 
| align=center| 2
| align=center| 3:54
| Saitama, Japan
|Middleweight bout.
|-
| Win
| align=center| 26–6–3 (1)
| Jean-François Lénogue
| Decision (unanimous)
| PRIDE: Bushido 13
| 
| align=center| 2
| align=center| 5:00
| Yokohama, Japan
|
|-
| Win
| align=center| 25–6–3 (1)
| Makoto Takimoto
| Decision (unanimous)
| PRIDE Shockwave 2005
| 
| align=center| 3
| align=center| 5:00
| Saitama, Japan
|
|-
| Win
| align=center| 24–6–3 (1)
| Webster Dauphiney
| Submission (achilles lock)
| Pancrase: Brave 10
| 
| align=center| 1
| align=center| 2:14
| Urayasu, Japan
|
|-
| Win
| align=center| 23–6–3 (1)
| Keith Rockel
| Decision (majority)
| Pancrase: Brave 4
| 
| align=center| 3
| align=center| 5:00
| Tokyo, Japan
|
|-
| Loss
| align=center| 22–6–3 (1)
| Yuki Kondo
| KO (punch)
| Pancrase: Hybrid 10
| 
| align=center| 3
| align=center| 0:08
| Tokyo, Japan
| Lost Pancrase Light Heavyweight Championship.
|-
| Win
| align=center| 22–5–3 (1)
| Elvis Sinosic
| Decision (unanimous)
| Pancrase: 10th Anniversary Show
| 
| align=center| 3
| align=center| 5:00
| Tokyo, Japan
|
|-
| Draw
| align=center| 21–5–3 (1)
| Yuki Kondo
| Draw
| Pancrase: Hybrid 5
| 
| align=center| 3
| align=center| 5:00
| Yokohama, Japan
|
|-
| Win
| align=center| 21–5–2 (1)
| Eduardo Pamplona
| Decision (unanimous)
| Pancrase: Spirit 8
| 
| align=center| 3
| align=center| 5:00
| Tokyo, Japan
|
|-
| Loss
| align=center| 20–5–2 (1)
| Antônio Rodrigo Nogueira
| KO (punch)
| UFO: Legend
| 
| align=center| 2
| align=center| 0:29
| Tokyo, Japan
|
|-
| Win
| align=center| 20–4–2 (1)
| Alexander Otsuka
| Decision (unanimous)
| PRIDE 20
| 
| align=center| 3
| align=center| 5:00
| Yokohama, Japan
|
|-
| Win
| align=center| 19–4–2 (1)
| Daisuke Watanabe
| Submission (arm-triangle choke)
| Pancrase: Proof 7
| 
| align=center| 1
| align=center| 2:14
| Yokohama, Japan
|
|-
| Win
| align=center| 18–4–2 (1)
| Ikuhisa Minowa
| TKO (cut)
| Pancrase: 2001 Anniversary Show
| 
| align=center| 2
| align=center| 4:30
| Yokohama, Japan
| Won Pancrase Light Heavyweight Championship.
|-
| Win
| align=center| 17–4–2 (1)
| Pshemek Wallace
| TKO (punches)
| DEEP: 2nd Impact
| 
| align=center| 1
| align=center| 1:52
| Yokohama, Japan
|
|-
| Win
| align=center| 16–4–2 (1)
| Matt Trihey
| Submission (armbar)
| Pancrase: Proof 4
| 
| align=center| 1
| align=center| 1:11
| Tokyo, Japan
|
|-
| NC
| align=center| 15–4–2 (1)
| Alex Stiebling
| No Contest (Kikuta was cut by an accidental headbutt)
| Pancrase: Proof 1
| 
| align=center| 1
| align=center| 3:11
| Tokyo, Japan
|
|-
| Win
| align=center| 15–4–2
| Kazuo Takahashi
| Submission (arm-triangle choke)
| Pancrase: Trans 7
| 
| align=center| 1
| align=center| 7:22
| Tokyo, Japan
|
|-
| Loss
| align=center| 14–4–2
| Murilo Bustamante
| Decision (unanimous)
| Pancrase: Trans 6
| 
| align=center| 1
| align=center| 15:00
| Tokyo, Japan
|
|-
| Win
| align=center| 14–3–2
| Ichio Matsubara
| Submission (armlock)
| Pancrase: Trans 4
| 
| align=center| 1
| align=center| 2:13
| Tokyo, Japan
|
|-
| Win
| align=center| 13–3–2
| Eugene Jackson
| Submission (armbar)
| UFC 25
| 
| align=center| 1
| align=center| 4:38
| Tokyo, Japan
|
|-
| Win
| align=center| 12–3–2
| Ryushi Yanagisawa
| Decision (unanimous)
| Pancrase: Trans 2
| 
| align=center| 1
| align=center| 15:00
| Osaka, Japan
|
|-
| Win
| align=center| 11–3–2
| Minoru Suzuki
| TKO (arm-triangle choke)
| Pancrase: Breakthrough 11
| 
| align=center| 1
| align=center| 2:39
| Yokohama, Japan
|
|-
| Draw
| align=center| 10–3–2
| Travis Fulton
| Draw
| Pancrase: Breakthrough 9
| 
| align=center| 1
| align=center| 15:00
| Tokyo, Japan
|
|-
| Win
| align=center| 10–3–1
| Eddy Millis
| Submission (punches)
| Pancrase: 1999 Anniversary Show
| 
| align=center| 1
| align=center| 1:57
| Urayasu, Japan
|
|-
| Win
| align=center| 9–3–1
| Takafumi Ito
| Decision (unanimous)
| Pancrase: Breakthrough 7
| 
| align=center| 2
| align=center| 3:00
| Tokyo, Japan
|
|-
| Win
| align=center| 8–3–1
| Eric Gedek
| Submission (rear-naked choke)
| Pancrase: Breakthrough 6
| 
| align=center| 3
| align=center| 1:20
| Tokyo, Japan
|
|-
| Loss
| align=center| 7–3–1
| Paul Jones
| Decision (unanimous)
| Shooto: Las Grandes Viajes 6
| 
| align=center| 3
| align=center| 5:00
| Tokyo, Japan
|
|-
| Draw
| align=center| 7–2–1
| Daijiro Matsui
| Draw (time limit)
| PRIDE 4
| 
| align=center| 3
| align=center| 10:00
| Tokyo, Japan
|
|-
| Loss
| align=center| 7–2
| Renzo Gracie
| Submission (guillotine choke)
| PRIDE 2
| 
| align=center| 6
| align=center| 0:43
| Yokohama, Japan
|
|-
| Win
| align=center| 7–1
| Masanori Suda
| Submission (armbar)
| Lumax Cup: Tournament of J '97 Heavyweight Tournament
| 
| align=center| 1
| align=center| 3:59
| Japan
| Won Lumax Cup: Tournament of J '97 Heavyweight Tournament.
|-
| Win
| align=center| 6–1
| Toshinobu Komeya
| Submission (achilles lock)
| Lumax Cup: Tournament of J '97 Heavyweight Tournament
| 
| align=center| 1
| align=center| 1:00
| Japan
|
|-
| Win
| align=center| 5–1
| Jun Kitagawa
| Submission (achilles lock)
| Lumax Cup: Tournament of J '97 Heavyweight Tournament
| 
| align=center| 1
| align=center| 3:14
| Japan
|
|-
| Loss
| align=center| 4–1
| Mushtaq Abdullah
| Submission (forearm choke)
| VTJ 1996: Vale Tudo Japan 1996
| 
| align=center| 1
| align=center| 6:27
| Tokyo, Japan
|
|-
| Win
| align=center| 4–0
| Masanori Suda
| Submission (heel hook)
| Lumax Cup: Tournament of J '96
| 
| align=center| 1
| align=center| 1:15
| Japan
| Won Lumax Cup: Tournament of J '96.
|-
| Win
| align=center| 3–0
| Hiroyuki Yoshioka
| Submission (heel hook)
| Lumax Cup: Tournament of J '96
| 
| align=center| 1
| align=center| 3:05
| Japan
|
|-
| Win
| align=center| 2–0
| Egan Inoue
| Decision
| Lumax Cup: Tournament of J '96
| 
| align=center| 1
| align=center| 5:00
| Japan
|
|-
| Win
| align=center| 1–0
| Saburo Kawakatsu
| Submission (keylock)
| Lumax Cup: Tournament of J '96
| 
| align=center| 1
| align=center| 2:04
| Japan
|

Mixed martial arts exhibition record

|-
| Draw
| align=center| 0-0-1
| Manabu Yamada
| Technical Draw
| DEEP 2001
| 
| align=center| 1
| align=center| 3:00
| Tokyo, Japan
| 
|-

Submission grappling record
KO PUNCHES
|- style="text-align:center; background:#f0f0f0;"
| style="border-style:none none solid solid; "|Result
| style="border-style:none none solid solid; "|Opponent
| style="border-style:none none solid solid; "|Method
| style="border-style:none none solid solid; "|Event
| style="border-style:none none solid solid; "|Date
| style="border-style:none none solid solid; "|Round
| style="border-style:none none solid solid; "|Time
| style="border-style:none none solid solid; "|Notes
|-
|Loss|| Renzo Gracie || Points || ADCC 2017 –88 kg|| 2017|| Overtime|| ||
|-
|Draw|| Minoru Suzuki and  Daiju Takase || Draw || The Contenders X-Rage Vol.1|| December 14, 2001|| 1|| 15:00||Partnered with  Takeshi Yamazaki
|-
|Win|| Saulo Ribeiro || Points || ADCC 2001 –88 kg|| 2001|| || ||
|-
|Win|| Egan Inoue ||  || ADCC 2001 –88 kg|| 2001|| || ||
|-
|Win|| Chris Brown ||  || ADCC 2001 –88 kg|| 2001|| || ||
|-
|Win|| Evan Tanner ||  || ADCC 2001 –88 kg|| 2001|| || ||
|-
|Loss|| Rigan Machado || Points || ADCC 1999 –99 kg|| 1999|| 1|| 10:00||
|-

See also 
List of male mixed martial artists

References

External links
 
 
 Official blog
 Official Grabaka site

1971 births
People from Nerima
Living people
Japanese male mixed martial artists
Welterweight mixed martial artists
Middleweight mixed martial artists
Light heavyweight mixed martial artists
Mixed martial artists utilizing judo
Mixed martial artists utilizing shootboxing
Mixed martial artists utilizing catch wrestling
Mixed martial artists utilizing Brazilian jiu-jitsu
Japanese practitioners of Brazilian jiu-jitsu
Japanese male judoka
Japanese catch wrestlers
Sportspeople from Tokyo
Ultimate Fighting Championship male fighters